The Shimashki or Simashki dynasty (lugal-ene si-mash-giki "Kings of the country of Simashgi"), was an early dynasty of the ancient region of Elam, to the southeast of Babylonia, in approximately 2100–1900 BCE. A list of twelve kings of Shimashki is found in the Elamite king-list of Susa, which also contains a list of kings of Awan dynasty. It is uncertain how historically accurate the list is (and whether it reflects a chronological order), although some of its kings can be corroborated by their appearance in the records of neighboring peoples. The dynasty corresponds to the middle part of the Old Elamite period (dated c.2700 – c. 1600 BC). It was followed by the Sukkalmah Dynasty. Shimashki was likely near today's Masjed Soleyman.

Nature of the "Dynasty"
Daryaee suggests that, despite the impression from the king-list that the rulers of Shimashki was a dynasty of sequential rulers, it is perhaps better to think of Shimashki as an alliance of various peoples "rather than a unitary state."

Occupation of Mesopotamia
The Shimashki confederacy led an alliance against the Ur III Empire, and managed to defeat its last ruler Ibbi-Sin. After this victory, they destroyed the kingdom, looted the capital of Ur, and ruled through military occupation for the next 21 years.

The Shimashki rulers became participants in an ongoing conflict with the rulers of Isin and Larsa after the fall of Third Dynasty of Ur.

Under the Shimashki and their successors the Sukkalmah, Elam then became one of the most powerful kingdoms of West Asia, influencing the territories of Mesopotamia and Syria through commercial, military or diplomatic contacts. Expansion in Mesopotamia was only halted by the Babylonian king Hammurabi in the 18th century BC. After a prolonged conflict, the military forces of Elam were finally forced to retreat their forces positioned along the Tigris river, and to return to Susa.

Paleography
Shimashki is first mentioned on the inscription to an image of Puzur-Inshushinak, king of Awan around 2100 BC, which depicts a Shimashkian king as subordinate to him.

The Shimashki dynasty was followed by the Sukkalmah dynasty (c. 1900–1500).

Individual Rulers

The names in the king-list, as found in Potts, are "Girnamme, Tazitta, Ebarti, Tazitta, Lu[?]-[x-x-x]-lu-uh-ha-an, Kindattu, Idaddu, Tan-Ruhurater, Ebarti, Idaddu, Idaddu-napir, Idaddu-temti, twelve Sumerian kings" (bracketed letters original).

Girnamme ruled at the same time as Shu-Sin, king of Ur, and was involved, as either a groom or simply a facilitator, in the marriage of Shu-Sin's daughter. Gwendolyn Leick places this event in 2037 BCE. Girnamme, along with Tazitta and Ebarti I, appears in "Mesopotamian texts establishing food rations issued to messengers," texts from 2044 to 2032 BCE.

Tazitta, the second figure in the list, is referred to in a document from the eighth year of the reign of Amar-Sin of Ur.

Kindattu was also known as Kindadu. A Kindattu, who according to Daryaeee was "apparently" the Shimashkian king of the list above, lead the army that destroyed the Third Dynasty of Ur in 2004 BCE.  The operation was a joint effort between Kindattu and his then-ally Ishbi-Erra, who defeated Ur and captured Ibbi-Sin, its king. The Ishbi-Erra hymn claims that Ishbi-Erra later expelled Kindattu from Mesopotamia.

Idaddu I (also known as Indattu-Inshushinak, or simply Indattu) called himself "king of Shimashki and Elam". According to Stolper and André-Salvini, he was the son of Kindattu, while Gwendolyn Leick calls him "son of Pepi," claiming that Kindattu may have been his grandfather. According to Leick he ascended to the throne of Shimashki around 1970 BCE.

Tan-Ruhurater, also known as Tan-Ruhuratir, formed an alliance with Bilalama, the governor of Eshnunna, by marrying Bilama's daughter Mê-Kubi.

Ebarti II of Shimashki may have been the same individual known as Ebarat, a Sukkalmah, or "Grand Regent". If so, he was ruler simultaneously to the next member of the list of twelve Shimaskin kings: Idaddu II.

Idaddu II was the son of Tan-Ruhurater, during whose reign he oversaw building projects as the governor of Susa. According to Leick, he was the last of the Shimashkian kings.

Rulers

See also
Awan dynasty
List of rulers of Elam

References

Sources
 Hinz, W., "The Lost World of Elam", London, 1972 (tr. F. Firuznia, دنیای گمشده ایلام, Tehran, 1992)
 Potts, D. T., The Archaeology of Elam, Cambridge University Press, 1999.

Elamite kings
Shimashki Dynasty